The Hilton Grand Vacations Tournament of Champions is a women's professional golf tournament on the LPGA Tour in Florida. It debuted in 2019 at the Four Seasons Golf & Sports Club Orlando in Lake Buena Vista, Florida. The tournament field is limited to winners on LPGA Tour events in the previous two years. As is the case in the past, there is also a pro-am and celebrity tournament, like its predecessor. The top amateurs during the midweek pro-am are invited to play in the main tournament. Each professional is paired with two celebrities or amateurs in the groupings, and celebrities change per round. A Stableford-based system is used for the celebrities and amateurs.

For 2022, under new corporate ownership of Hilton Grand Vacations and tournament director Aaron Stewart, son of World Golf Hall of Fame member Payne, the event moves to the Lake Nona Golf & Country Club in Orlando. The move to Lake Nona also eliminates an issue that the 18th hole, a par 3, caused at Four Seasons where the 2020 tournament was pushed to an extra day on Monday morning as the single playoff hole (the 18th) failed to produce a winner, and it was the seventh playing of the 18th hole that finally created a winner.

The celebrity division continues to be controlled by Mardy Fish and John Smoltz; the two have won three each.

In the United States, the final round of the tournament is broadcast on NBC.

Tournament names
2019–2021: Diamond Resorts Tournament of Champions presented by IOA
2022: Hilton Grand Vacations Tournament of Champions

Winners

Pro Division

Note: 2020 tournament extended to five days because of darkness.

Celebrities and amateurs
During the Pro-Am tournament that is held earlier in the week, the top amateur golfers are invited to participate in the main tournament.  

For both amateurs and celebrities, the golfers play a modified Stableford system, although the LPGA and organisers chose to base scores on double bogey instead of par.

Note:  The celebrity tournament is regarded as a continuation of the Diamond Resorts Invitational celebrity division.

Tournament records

See also
Diamond Resorts Invitational

References

External links
Coverage on the LPGA Tour's official site

LPGA Tour events
Golf in Florida
Golf in Orlando, Florida
Recurring sporting events established in 2019
2019 establishments in Florida